Psylla alni is a species of psyllid, a plant-feeding hemipteran in the family Psyllidae.

Distribution
This species is present in the Palearctic realm (from Europe to Siberia and Sakhalin, Kazakhstan, Caucasus) and in the Nearctic realm (Canada and United States of America).

Description
These rather large psyllids have a green head, body, and legs, and rather long antennae. The costal marginal veins of the wings are green, while the other veins are brown. Adults are initially green, later becoming orange, brown, or reddish. The nymphs are usually covered by white waxy secretions.

Biology
Adults can be found from June to October. This species has one generation a year (univoltine) and overwinters as an egg.

It is monophagous on most Betulaceae (Alnus glutinosa, Alnus hirsuta, Alnus incana, Alnus japonica, Alnus viridis). Larvae feed on young shoots in the leaf axils.

References

Psyl'list: Psylloidea database. Ouvrard D.,

Psyllidae
Hemiptera of Asia
Hemiptera of Europe
Hemiptera of North America
Insects described in 1758
Taxa named by Carl Linnaeus